Dave Deyoe (born December 14, 1960) is the Iowa State Representative from the 51st District. He has served in the Iowa House of Representatives since January 2007.

Deyoe currently serves on several committees in the Iowa House – the Agriculture, Appropriations, Economic Growth, and the Environmental Protection committees.  He also serves as the chair of the Economic Development Appropriations budget subcommittee.

Electoral history
*incumbent

References

External links
 Representative Dave Deyoe official Iowa General Assembly site
 
 Financial information (state office) at the National Institute for Money in State Politics
 Profile at Iowa House Republicans

1960 births
21st-century American politicians
Farmers from Iowa
Iowa State University alumni
Living people
Republican Party members of the Iowa House of Representatives
People from Nevada, Iowa
Politicians from Manhattan, Kansas